The International Film Festival of the Art of Cinematography Camerimage is a festival dedicated to the celebration of cinematography and recognition of its creators, cinematographers. The first seven events (1993–1999) were held in Toruń, Poland. The next ten events (2000–2009) were held in Łódź. From 2010 until 2018 the festival took place in Bydgoszcz, before returning to Toruń in 2019, where it currently remains. In 2007, the name of the festival was changed from Camerimage to Plus Camerimage but was changed back in 2013 after the sponsorship deal with Plus ended. At the end of November every year, Camerimage brings together professional cinematographers, students and other people associated with the film industry. The Camerimage festival spans over a course of one week, with multiple events at one time.

The festival has hosted many prominent actors, actresses and filmmakers including Quentin Tarantino, Richard Gere, Edward Norton, Keanu Reeves, Roman Polański, Darren Aronofsky, Alfonso Cuarón, Emir Kusturica, Gus Van Sant, Ang Lee, István Szabó, Andrzej Wajda, Ken Loach, David Lynch, Wim Wenders, Ralph Fiennes, Ed Harris, Charlize Theron, Oliver Stone, Agnieszka Holland, Rutger Hauer, Liam Neeson, Isabelle Huppert, Jeremy Irons, Peter Weir, Krzysztof Kieślowski, James Ivory, Danny DeVito, Irène Jacob, Jim Jarmusch, Roland Joffé, Aki Kaurismäki, Val Kilmer, Nastassja Kinski, Andrei Konchalovsky, Jiří Menzel, Volker Schlöndorff, Viggo Mortensen, Bill Murray, Jessica Lange, Paweł Pawlikowski, Peter Greenaway, Tom Tykwer, Robert Richardson, Alan Rickman, John Malkovich and Denis Villeneuve.

Awards

Main Competition
 Golden Frog (Złota Żaba)
 Silver Frog (Srebrna Żaba)
 Bronze Frog (Brązowa Żaba)

Student Etudes Competition (Konkurs etiud studenckich)
 Golden Tadpole (Złota Kijanka)
 Silver Tadpole (Srebrna Kijanka)
 Bronze Tadpole (Brązowa Kijanka)

Documentary Films Competition
 Documentary Shorts Competition
 Documentary Features Competition

Feature Debuts Competition
 Directors' Debuts Competition
 Cinematographers' Debuts Competition

Music Videos Competition
 Best Music Video
 Best Cinematography in Music Video

3D Films Competition
Polish Films Competition
Camerimage Lifetime Achievement Award
Cinematographer - Director Duo Award
Special Krzysztof Kieslowski Award for Director

Main competition

Golden Frog winners
"†" indicates a nominee for the Academy Award for Best Cinematography.

Additional festival events 
 Camerimage Market
 Equipment showcases
 Various exhibitions and live music performances
 Student Panorama (screenings of student films which did not make it into the main competition)
 Camerimage Forum (a seminar devoted to authorship rights and working conditions of cinematographers)
 Special screenings and premieres, reviews, retrospectives, meetings, seminars, and workshops led by well known filmmakers

Academy Awards
Since 2013, short documentary films awarded the Golden Frog during Camerimage festival are granted consideration in the Documentary Short Subject category of the Academy Awards without having to meet the standard theatrical run requirement. To meet all requirements, the running time limit of selected short documentary was decreased from 60 to 40 minutes. This way requirements for short documentary films selected at both Camerimage festival and the Academy Awards are the same.

References

Further reading
 Congratulations to Camerimage winners, Arri, 2010
 Plus Camerimage Gets Oscar Nod, Film New Europe, March 12, 2013
 For Cinematographers, All Roads Lead to Camerimage, Variety, November 6, 2015
 Camerimage: A Film Festival Where Cinematographers Are the Stars, The New York Times, November 20, 2015
 Where the Cinematographer is in First Position: The 2015 Camerimage Festival, Filmmaker Magazine, December 9, 2015
 CAMERIMAGE: A Unique Festival Honoring the Art and Craft of Cinematography, Cinephilia & Beyond, November 15, 2015
 Poland's Camerimage Film Festival to Partner with AFI, ASC for Winner Showcase in LA, Broadway World, September 20, 2013

External links
 

Polish film awards
Film festivals in Poland
Toruń
Events in Łódź
Bydgoszcz
Film festivals established in 1993